William Edward "Bill" Todd (born 1961) was appointed in May 2019 as Deputy Under Secretary for Management. He also served as the Acting Under Secretary of State for Management from February 2018 to May 2019.

Previous responsibilities
Ambassador Todd was the Acting Assistant Secretary for South and Central Asian Affairs from January 2017 and had served as the Principal Deputy Assistant Secretary for the same bureau since August 2015.

Immediately prior, he served as the United States Ambassador to Cambodia beginning in 2012.  He was confirmed on March 29, 2012 by the U.S. Senate and sworn in on April 17, 2012. He officially became the United States Ambassador to Cambodia when King Norodom Sihamoni accepted his credentials on June 8, 2012. During his time in Cambodia he focused on the advancement of democracy, human rights, regional stability, counterterrorism and trade and investment   and directed a very successful large and complex development and assistance program that improved the daily lives of the average Cambodian .  He also authored a widely read weekly newspaper column called, "Ask the Ambassador."

Before his appointment to Cambodia, he served as the Coordinating Director of Development and Economic Affairs at the U.S. Embassy in Kabul. While in Afghanistan, he was responsible for all nonmilitary civilian assistance in Afghanistan, including implementation of the largest foreign assistance program and budget in U.S. history. In this capacity he also directed civilian field operations with an American staff of over 600, including 350 civilians embedded with the military in most of Afghanistan's 34 provinces and at five regional Provincial Reconstruction Teams (PRTs).

Career highlights

2008 to 2010
From 2008 to 2010, Ambassador Todd was the U.S. Ambassador to Brunei Darussalam.  During his time in Brunei, he focused on regional stability, counterterrorism, democratization, and trade and investment.

2006 to 2008
Prior to serving as Ambassador to Brunei, Ambassador Todd was the Acting Inspector General of the Department of State in 2008 and Deputy Inspector General from 2006 to 2008.  In both capacities, he directed all Office of Inspector General activities, domestically and abroad, including at 260 diplomatic missions in 163 countries.

2002 to 2006
From 2002 to 2006, Ambassador Todd served in the Bureau of International Narcotics and Law Enforcement Affairs (INL) at the Department of State.  Over this period he served in several INL senior positions, including Principal Deputy Assistant Secretary (PDAS), Deputy Assistant Secretary for International Civilian Police and Rule of Law Programs and for the Office of Asia, Africa, Europe and the Middle East, as well as Executive Director and Controller.  As PDAS, he was the Chief Operating Officer for global programs, including all post-conflict activities.  His leadership placed him at the forefront of international programs for rule of law, police training, and counternarcotics efforts in some of the most volatile regions of the world, including Iraq, Afghanistan, and Colombia.  Ambassador Todd managed more than 4,000 employees and contractors in more than 75 theaters of operation.

Ambassadorial nomination
In February 2020, he was nominated to be the next U.S. Ambassador to Pakistan. On January 3, 2021, his nomination was returned to the President under Rule XXXI, Paragraph 6 of the United States Senate.

Family life
Ambassador Todd is married to Ann Buckingham-Todd and has four children.  He holds a B.S. from Longwood College and is also a Certified Public Accountant, licensed in the State of Virginia.

References

External links

 From the Penh of the Ambassador- Official Blog of Ambassador William E. Todd

|-

1961 births
Living people
Ambassadors of the United States to Brunei
Ambassadors of the United States to Cambodia
American accountants
Longwood University alumni
United States Foreign Service personnel
United States Assistant Secretaries of State